Clepsis illustrana is a species of moth of the family Tortricidae. It is found in Sweden, Finland and the Near East. It has also been recorded from Canada.

The wingspan is 15–20 mm. Adults have been recorded on wing in May and July.

References

Moths described in 1936
Clepsis